Graham Passage is a passage separating Murray Island from Pefaur (Ventimiglia) Peninsula on the west coast of Graham Land, Antarctica.  It is fed by Agalina Glacier.

The passage was named by Captain Skidsmo after his whale catcher Graham, which was the first to pass through it, on March 20, 1922.

References

Straits of Graham Land
Danco Coast